Jackie Potter (born 9 April 1948 in Sydney, New South Wales) is an Australian former cricket player. Potter played one tests and six one day internationals for the Australia women's national cricket team.

References

External links
 Jackie Potter at CricketArchive
 Jackie Potter at southernstars.org.au

Living people
1948 births
Australia women Test cricketers
Australia women One Day International cricketers
New South Wales Breakers cricketers